Tanah Tinggi is an administrative village in the Johar Baru district of Indonesia. It has a postal code of 10540.

Tanah Tinggi residential area
Tanah Tinggi residential neighborhood, just to the east of Pasar Senen, was one of the major housing initiatives planned by the Jakarta city government in the 1950s. In 1951, 25 hectares of land were designated for housing in Tanah Tinggi. In the 1960s, the residential area had been established.

See also
 List of administrative villages of Jakarta

References

Cited works

Administrative villages in Jakarta